Frederick Alder (21 June 1889 – 13 February 1960) was an Australian rules footballer who played with Richmond in the Victorian Football League (VFL).

Notes

External links 

1889 births
1960 deaths
Australian rules footballers from Victoria (Australia)
Richmond Football Club players